Near Nadir is a studio album by four musicians Ikue Mori, Mark Nauseef, Evan Parker and Bill Laswell. The album was released in 2011 for Zorn's Tzadik Records.

Track listing
All songs by Ikue Mori, Mark Nauseef, Evan Parker and Bill Laswell.
"Majuu" – 3:33
"Valhalla" – 4:22
"In Gold Mesh" – 4:00
"Orbs" – 2:13
"Nooks" – 3:06
"Funnel Drone" – 2:23
"Yuga Warp" – 6:41
"Near Nadir" – 5:34
"Ternary Rite +" – 4:33
"Flo Vi Ru Dub" – 8:54

Personnel
Bill Laswell − basses
Ikue Mori − electronics
Evan Parker − soprano saxophone
Mark Nauseef − bent metal, meditation bells, chinese drums, woodblocks, tom-tom

References

External links 
 Near Nadir at Discogs (list of releases)

Bill Laswell albums
Evan Parker albums
Tzadik Records albums
2011 albums
Ikue Mori albums